In sailing, chafing is the process of wear on a line or sail caused by constant rubbing against a hard, usually metallic, surface.  Various methods are used to prevent chafing.  Chafing of lines that rest on a choke on a boat can be prevented by putting a protecting material (sometimes as simple as a piece of old garden hose) around the line.  Chafing of a sail rubbing against a cable can be prevented on large ships by tying  around the cable.

See also
 Baggywrinkle

References

Sailing